Angels Are Made of Light is a 2018 documentary film by James Longley.

Reception

Critical response 

References

External links